The Playbook is a 2020 docuseries starring Patrick Mouratoglou, Glenn 'Doc' Rivers, Jill Ellis, José Mourinho, and Dawn Staley.

Episodes

Release 
The Playbook was released on September 22, 2020, on Netflix.

References

External links 
 
 

2020 American television series debuts
English-language Netflix original programming
Netflix original documentary television series
Television series by Boardwalk Pictures
Television series by SpringHill Entertainment